Malpais-Sint Michiel is a 1,100 ha tract of land, a former plantation just north of Sint Michiels Bay, on the southern coast of Curaçao, a constituent island nation of the Kingdom of the Netherlands in the Dutch Caribbean. It has been identified as an Important Bird Area by BirdLife International because it supports populations of bare-eyed pigeons, American coots, common terns and Caribbean elaenias, as well as a large brown-throated parakeet roost. It comprises two wetlands – a freshwater dam and a saline lagoon – with their surrounding thorn scrub vegetation. The waterbodies are used by a variety of waterbirds, including American flamingos, and the vegetation is used by resident and migratory passerines as well as by wintering raptors. The area has also been recognised as a Ramsar site as a wetland of international importance.

References

Important Bird Areas of the Dutch Caribbean
Birds of Curaçao
Bodies of water of Curaçao
Protected areas of Curaçao
Ramsar sites in the Netherlands